Hynam (formerly Hynam East) is a town and locality in the Australian state of South Australia located in the state's south-east within the Limestone Coast region on the border with the state of Victoria about  south east of the state capital of Adelaide and about  east of the municipal seat of Naracoorte.

Hynam began as a government town proclaimed as Hynam East on 10 June 1909.  It is located adjacent to the Hynam Railway Station and consisted of two parts which were respectively placed on the north and south sides of the railway line.  Its name was 'altered' to 'Hynam' on 20 February 1941.  Boundaries for the locality of Hynam were created on 12 April 2001.  Its boundaries include the Government Town of Hynam and northern part of the site of the ceased Government Town of Jessie.

Hynam was on the Mount Gambier railway line between Wolseley and Mount Gambier, South Australia which closed on 12 April 1995.

The 2016 Australian census which was conducted in August 2016 reports that the part of Hynam north of the Wimmera Highway in the east and the unsealed roads of Nolans and Parsons in the west, had a population of 151 people while the part of Hynam south of the above-mentioned roads shared 61 people with the locality of Laurie Park.

Hynam is located within the federal division of Barker, the state electoral district of MacKillop and the local government area of the Naracoorte Lucindale Council.

References
Notes

Citations

Towns in South Australia
Limestone Coast